Örebro University is a state university in Örebro, Sweden.

The university has its roots in the Örebro campus of Uppsala University, which became an independent state university college in 1977,  Örebro University College (Högskolan i Örebro). The university college also incorporated three other existing educational institutions in Örebro: the teaching seminar, the sports college (founded in 1966) and the social work college (founded 1967). Örebro University College was granted the privileges of a university by the Government of Sweden in 1999, becoming the 12th university in Sweden.

On 30 March 2010 the university was granted the right to award medical degrees in collaboration with Örebro University Hospital, making it the 7th medical school in Sweden. 

The law programme at Örebro University is one of Sweden's most popular programmes (number 10 in 2018, with more than 4,800 applicants).

History

In 1967, Uppsala University established a branch in Örebro, the College of Social Sciences. In 1977, Örebro University College was established through a merger of the Uppsala University branch in Örebro, the Preschool Teaching Seminary, and the College of Physical Education and Sport Science, and the College of Social Sciences. In 1999, the university college was granted the status of a university by the Government of Sweden and opened by Prime Minister Göran Persson on 6 February 1999.

Rankings 

Örebro University is ranked in the 401-500 band in the Times Higher Education world ranking. The university’s place is 403. 

Örebro University is ranked number 84 on the Times Higher Education’s list of the best young universities in the world. This list includes only universities established less than 50 years ago.

Faculties 

 Faculty of Business, Science and Engineering
 Faculty of Humanities and Social Sciences
 Faculty of Medicine and Health

Schools
Business School
School of Health Sciences
School of Hospitality, Culinary Arts and Meal Science
School of Humanities, Education and Social Sciences
School of Law, Psychology and Social work
School of Medical Sciences
School of Music, Theatre and Art
School of Science and Technology

Vice-Chancellors
Thore Hammarland (1977–1978)
Stefan Björklund (1978–1982)
Anders Stening (1983–1989)
Ingemar Lind (1990–1999)
Janerik Gidlund (1999–2008)
Jens Schollin (2008–2016)
Johan Schnürer (2016–present)

Notable people

Alumni

Lars Adaktusson, Member of the European Parliament
Stefan Borsch, vocalist, Vikingarna (1973–1979)
Johan Dennelind, CEO, Telia Company
Lars Joel Eriksson, politics editor, Skånska Dagbladet
Fredrick Federley, Member of Parliament, Centre Party
Nataliya Gumenyuk, Ukrainian journalist, teacher
Mats Jansson, CEO, SAS Group (2007–2010)
Hans Karlsson, Minister for Employment
Ulrika Knape, Olympic medalist in diving (1972 and 1976)
Pernilla Månsson Colt, television host
Göran Persson, Swedish Prime Minister (1996–2006)
Ali Sadeghian, musician, singer, songwriter, and actor
Elisabeth Svantesson, Minister for Employment, Member of Parliament, Moderate Party
Sten Tolgfors, Minister for Defense and Foreign Trade, Member of Parliament, Moderate Party
Rickard Olsson, television and radio host
Sven-Göran Eriksson, Football manager
Marika Domanski Lyfors, coach of the Swedish women's national football team (1996–2005)

Faculty
Anna G. Jónasdóttir, political science, gender studies; Professor Emerita
Fuat Deniz, sociology, killed on campus on 13 December 2007

Gallery

See also
:Category:Örebro University alumni

References

External links

Örebro University - Official site

 
Universities in Sweden
Örebro
Educational institutions established in 1977
Buildings and structures in Örebro
1977 establishments in Sweden